The 2017–18 North Texas Mean Green women's basketball team represents the University of North Texas during the 2017–18 NCAA Division I women's basketball season. The Mean Green, led by third year head coach Jalie Mitchell, play their home games UNT Coliseum, also known as The Super Pit, and were members of Conference USA. They finished the season 17–14, 6–10 in C-USA play to finish in a 3-way tie for tenth place. They advanced to the semifinals of the C-USA women's tournament where they lost to Western Kentucky.

Previous season
They finished the season 12–19, 8–10 in C-USA play to finish in a 3-way tie for eighth place. They advanced to the quarterfinals of the C-USA women's tournament where they lost to WKU.

Roster

Schedule

|-
!colspan=9 style=| Exhibition

|-
!colspan=9 style=| Non-conference regular Season

|-
!colspan=9 style=| Conference USA regular Season

|-
!colspan="9" style=| Conference USA Women's Tournament

See also
2017–18 North Texas Mean Green men's basketball team

References

2017-18
2017–18 Conference USA women's basketball season
2017 in sports in Texas
2018 in sports in Texas